Pournouroozi (Nowruz Ali) (also Romanized as Nowrūz-e ʿAlī) is president of  Kavidak village council who has built mega projects Hoseinie in Khavidak. He persuaded Haji four Ostad to invest in that project.  He also was manager of project to carry water from 1000 meter deep well to field for agriculture usage.

References 

Populated places in Izeh County